Rachel Roberts may refer to:
Rachel Roberts (actress) (1927–1980), Welsh actress
Rachel Victoria Roberts, British actress sometimes credited as Rachel Roberts
Rachel Roberts (mathematician), American mathematician
Rachel Roberts (model) (born 1978), Canadian model and actress
Rachel Roberts (politician), member of the Kentucky House of Representatives
Rachel Roberts, author of the Avalon: Web of Magic series

See also
Rachael Robertson (disambiguation)